The Rosehill Gardens Racecourse is located in the Western Sydney suburb of Rosehill, in the state of New South Wales, Australia. It is operated by the Australian Turf Club. Rosehill holds horse races for thoroughbred gallopers on a grass surface. It is one of the two premier racecourses in Sydney, the other one being Randwick Racecourse. One of the main events held at Rosehill is the Golden Slipper race for two-year-olds.

History 
John Bennett purchased a large section of Rosehill to construct a racecourse and recreation area. Construction started in 1883 and was completed in April 1885 for a grand total of £12,000. Bennett constructed a private railway line connecting the racecourse to the main line located at Clyde which opened on 17 November 1888.

From 1943 Rosehill Gardens Racecourse was managed by the Sydney Turf Club and remained so until 2011. In 2011, the Sydney Turf Club and Australian Jockey Club combined to become the Australian Turf Club. The Australian Turf Club are the current owners and operators of Rosehill Gardens Racecourse.

Races 
The following is a list of Group races which are run at Rosehill Racecourse.

References

External links
Australian Turf Club - Rosehill

Horse racing venues in Australia
Sports venues in Sydney